Anthony Henley Henley, 3rd Baron Henley (12 April 1825 – 27 November 1898), also 1st Baron Northington in the Peerage of the United Kingdom, was a British peer and Liberal Member of Parliament.

Henley was the son of Robert Henley, 2nd Baron Henley. Lord Chancellor Robert Henley, 1st Earl of Northington, was his great-grandfather. He succeeded his father as third Baron Henley in 1841 but as this was an Irish peerage it did not entitle him to a seat in the House of Lords. He was instead elected to the House of Commons for Northampton in 1859, a seat he held until 1874. In 1885 the Northington title held by his great-grandfather was revived when he was created Baron Northington, of Watford in the County of Northampton, in the Peerage of the United Kingdom. This title gave him and the later Barons an automatic seat in the House of Lords.

He was appointed High Sheriff of Northamptonshire for 1854.

Lord Henley married, firstly, Julia Emily Augusta, daughter of the Very Reverend John Peel, Dean of Worcester, in 1846. After her death in 1862 he married, secondly, Clara Campbell Lucy, daughter of Joseph H. S. Jekyll, in 1870. He died in November 1898, aged 73, and was succeeded in his titles by his eldest son Frederick. Lady Henley died in 1922.

References
Kidd, Charles, Williamson, David (editors). Debrett's Peerage and Baronetage (1990 edition). New York: St Martin's Press, 1990,

External links 
 

1825 births
1898 deaths
Barons in the Peerage of Ireland
Anthony Henley
High Sheriffs of Northamptonshire
Liberal Party (UK) MPs for English constituencies
UK MPs 1859–1865
UK MPs 1865–1868
UK MPs 1868–1874
Henley, B3
UK MPs who were granted peerages
Northington, Anthony Henley, 1st Baron
Peers of the United Kingdom created by Queen Victoria
Barons Henley